Jiangxi Agricultural University (JXAU) is located in the northern suburbs of Nanchang city. Nanchang is the capital city of Jiangxi province. JXAU is a key province-run university and is one of the first universities in China to confer bachelor's and master's degrees. The campus is beautiful with pleasant environment and scenery.

With 16 colleges, JXAU offers degrees in 61 academic majors. Since its establishment in 1940, over 70,000 students have graduated from JXAU. Even though the university places key emphasis in school education, considerable amount of progress has been made in the field of academic research, vocational training and community services.

Administration
The university consist of the following faculties and schools. These are;
College of Agronomy
Institute of the Arts
College of Animal Science and Technology
College of Engineering
Institute of Land and Resources and the Environment
Computer and Information Engineering College
The Economic and Trade Institute
The Humanities and Institute of Public Administration
The Vocational Teachers ( Technology) College
Nanchang Business College
Software Division in the Institute of Adult Education College

External links
Jiangxi Agriculture University(JXAU) Official website 
JXAU Official website 
Nanchang Business College Official website

 
Universities and colleges in Jiangxi
Educational institutions established in 1940
Universities in Nanchang
1940 establishments in China